Purnell's Illustrated Encyclopedia of modern Weapons and Warfare is a partwork originating with Purnell in 1967–1969, republished under the Phoebus brand.

Its contributors and editors included Bill Gunston (aviation), Ian V. Hogg (land weapons), John Batchelor (illustrations) and editor Bernard Fitzsimons.  The quality of these lead contributors ensured high quality and accuracy in the finished product.  

The publication covers the twentieth century to publication, in alphabetical order, in 125 volumes.  Levels of detail varied from a short paragraph, to several pages of technical and operational analysis.

In addition to the main content there were a number of John Batchelor posters and other promotional offers.

A 24-volume encyclopedia, The Illustrated Encyclopedia of 20th Century Weapons and Warfare, was published in 1977. It was distributed by Columbia House.

References

Encyclopedias of the military
Partworks